Billboard Frolics is a 1935 Warner Bros. Merrie Melodies directed by Friz Freleng. The short was released on November 16, 1935.

The short features the song "Merrily We Roll Along" (which would later become the opening theme for the Merrie Melodies cartoons, starting with Boulevardier from the Bronx).

Plot
The plot consists of signs and billboards coming to life and dancing to the song, and eventually a chick (parody of the Bon Ami chick) jumps down and starts interacting with the environment. A cat sees the chick and starts chasing him, and the other advertisements (including parodies of His Master's Voice and an Arm & Hammer logo) rally to protect the chick.

References

External links

1935 films
1935 animated films
Films scored by Bernard B. Brown
Films scored by Norman Spencer (composer)
Short films directed by Friz Freleng
Merrie Melodies short films
Warner Bros. Cartoons animated short films
1930s Warner Bros. animated short films